Federico Bocchia (born 24 October 1986) is an Italian Olympic swimmer. He represented his country at the 2016 Summer Olympics.

References 

1986 births
Living people
Italian male swimmers
Swimmers at the 2016 Summer Olympics
Olympic swimmers of Italy
Mediterranean Games bronze medalists for Italy
Mediterranean Games medalists in swimming
Swimmers at the 2009 Mediterranean Games
Italian male freestyle swimmers
20th-century Italian people
21st-century Italian people